Swinside is a hill in the northwestern area of the English Lake District. It is small, wooded and surrounded by much bigger and more popular fells, meaning it is often overlooked. Alfred Wainwright, for instance, failed to include it in his pictorial guides to fells in the Lake District.

Unlike many of its grander neighbours, Swinside is a Marilyn as a result of being surrounded by a moat of low boggy ground. Until recently it was also completely covered by trees, but a track now leads up to the summit where the trees have been felled. The land is privately owned and there is no public footpath to the summit although the owner recently allowed local residents from the nearby village of Portinscale to visit the summit on a sponsored walk.

Marilyns of England
Fells of the Lake District